Walter Blanding Jr. (born August 14, 1971, Cleveland) is an American jazz saxophonist and clarinetist.

Blanding grew up in a musical family in New York City; both his parents played in the house band at the New York jazz club Village Gate, and Blanding played with them as a teenager. He studied under Barry Harris and went to Fiorello H. LaGuardia High School. He was a member of the group Tough Young Tenors, who recorded an album in 1991, and lived for several years in Israel in the mid-1990s. After returning he became a member of the Lincoln Center Jazz Orchestra and was involved with live performances of Wynton Marsalis's Blood on the Fields. Blanding has performed or recorded with Farid Barron, the Count Basie Orchestra, Cab Calloway, Wycliffe Gordon, Roy Hargrove, The Harper Brothers, Louis Hayes, Illinois Jacquet, Ryan Kisor, Odean Pope, Eric Reed, Marcus Roberts, and Rodney Whitaker.

Discography
 The Olive Tree (Criss Cross Jazz, 1999)

As sideman 
With Wynton Marsalis
 Big Train (Columbia/Sony Classical, 1999)

Other work 
As a member of the Lincoln Center Jazz Orchestra, Blanding spent time at the orchestra's Shanghai branch, Jazz at Lincoln Center Shanghai.

During his time in Shanghai, Blanding also worked with the student jazz band at Shanghai Community International School Pudong.

References

American jazz saxophonists
American male saxophonists
American jazz clarinetists
Jazz musicians from Ohio
American male jazz musicians
Jazz at Lincoln Center Orchestra members
1971 births
Living people